Say It Again is a lost 1926 silent film comedy-romance produced by Famous Players-Lasky and released through Paramount Pictures. It starred Richard Dix and was directed by Gregory La Cava.

Cast
Richard Dix - Bob Howard
Alyce Mills - Princess Elena
Chester Conklin - Prince Otto V
Gunboat Smith - Gunner Jones
Bernard Randall - Baron Ertig
Paul Porcasi - Count Tanza
Ida Waterman - Marguerite
William Ricciardi - Prime Minister Stemmler

References

External links
Say It Again at IMDb.com

1926 films
American silent feature films
Lost American films
Paramount Pictures films
Films directed by Gregory La Cava
1926 romantic comedy films
American romantic comedy films
American black-and-white films
1926 lost films
1920s American films
Silent romantic comedy films
Silent American comedy films